WRSY (101.5 MHz) is a commercial FM radio station licensed to Marlboro, Vermont. The station is owned by the Monadnock Radio Group subsidiary of Saga Communications.

WRSY airs an adult album alternative radio format, via a simulcast of 93.9 WRSI in Turners Falls, Massachusetts.  WRSY is heard in Southeastern Vermont and Southwestern New Hampshire.

History
When it was being built, the station first took its call sign WAIG on May 20, 1994, and changed to WSSH on March 1, 1996.  It officially launched in July 1996, airing a soft adult contemporary format, simulcast with 95.3 WZSH in Hartford, Vermont (now WZLF).

Vox purchased the stations from Dynacom in 1999.  Vox switched WSSH to the WRSI simulcast on February 1, 2001. The station was granted the WRSY call sign on April 12.  Saga acquired WRSI and WRSY in 2003.

References

External links

RSY
Adult album alternative radio stations in the United States
Radio stations established in 1996
1996 establishments in Vermont